Shoun Handirisi (born 6 October 1994) is a Zimbabwean first-class cricketer. He was part of Zimbabwe's squad for the 2014 ICC Under-19 Cricket World Cup.

References

External links
 

1994 births
Living people
Zimbabwean cricketers
Sportspeople from Harare
Wicket-keepers